Storyteller, story teller, or story-teller may refer to:

 A person who does storytelling

Arts and entertainment

Film
Oidhche Sheanchais, also called The Storyteller; 1935 Irish short film
 Narradores de Javé (Storytellers), a 2003 Brazilian film by Eliane Caffé
 O Contador de Histórias (The Story of Me or The Storyteller), a 2009 Brazilian film directed by Luiz Villaça
 The Storyteller (film), the original title of the 2017 film The Evil Within, directed by Andrew Getty

Television 
 "Storyteller" (Buffy the Vampire Slayer), a 2003 episode of Buffy the Vampire Slayer
 "The Storyteller" (Star Trek: Deep Space Nine), a 1993 episode of Star Trek: Deep Space Nine
 "The Storyteller" (The Twilight Zone), a 1986 episode of The Twilight Zone
 The StoryTeller (TV series), a 1988 television series by Jim Henson
 VH1 Storytellers, a VH1 music series
 The Storyteller Sequence, sequence of one-act dramas for young people by Philip Ridley

Fine arts 
 Storyteller (pottery), a motif in Pueblo pottery
 The Storyteller (sculpture), a 2003 outdoor bronze sculpture by Pete Helzer, installed in Eugene, Oregon, U.S.
 Storytellers (statue), a bronze statue depicting Walt Disney, by Rick Terry and Ray Spencer

Gaming 
 Storyteller (computer game), a 2021 game by Daniel Benmergui
 Gamemaster, a person who acts as an organizer, officiant for regarding rules, arbitrator, and moderator for a multiplayer role-playing game
 Story Teller (computer game), a word game by Edu-Ware
 Role-playing game systems created by White Wolf Publishing:
 Storyteller System (1991) 
 Storytelling System (2004)

Publications
 Story Teller (magazine), a children's magazine from 1982 to 1985
 The Story-Teller, an early 20th-century British fiction magazine
 Storyteller (Silko book), a 1981 collection of poetry and stories by Leslie Marmon Silko
 Storyteller (novel), a 2003 novel by Amy Thomson
 The Storyteller (Vargas Llosa novel), a 1987 novel by Mario Vargas Llosa
 The Storyteller (Picoult novel), a 2013 novel by Jodi Picoult
 "The Storyteller", a short story by H. H. Munro (Saki)
 A Suspension of Mercy, a 1965 novel by Patricia Highsmith also published under the name The Story-Teller
 The Storyteller, the third book in Traci Chee's Sea of Ink and Gold trilogy, published in 2018

Music

Groups
 Storytellers (Norwegian band), a Norwegian jazz group
 The Storyteller (band), a Swedish heavy metal band

Albums
 Storyteller (Marilyn Crispell album), 2003
 Storyteller (Donovan album), 2003
 Storyteller (Raghav album), 2004
 Storyteller (Crystal Waters album), 1994
 Storyteller (Carrie Underwood album), 2015
 Storyteller (Alfie Boe album), 2012
 Storyteller – The Complete Anthology: 1964–1990, a 1989 album by Rod Stewart
 The Story Teller, a 2010 album by Clutchy Hopkins
 The Storyteller, a 1998 album by Ray Davies

Songs
 "Storyteller", a song on Bradley Joseph's 1997 album Rapture

See also
 Storytelling (disambiguation)
 Story (disambiguation)